The Federation of Oils, Seeds and Fats Associations (FOSFA International) is the main trade association for the oil, seeds and fats industry. It regulates legal contracts in the trade/industry.

History
FOSFA was incorporated in 1968. It serves communities in the United Kingdom.

Function
85% of worldwide trade in oils and fats is under FOSFA contracts. It regulates trade in the industry. Its rules cover products transported with Cost, Insurance and Freight (CIF) or Freight on Board (FOB).

The advantage of having the vast majority of worldwide trade under FOSFA contracts is that using standard contracts reduces the risk of misinterpretations or misunderstandings between trading parties. Additionally, these standard form contracts are familiar to trading parties and reflective of trade practices that are longstanding in the industry. 

It holds week-long residential training courses during the Autumn at The University of Greenwich.

References

Oils and fats technologies
Organisations based in the City of London
International trade organizations
Arbitration organizations
Organizations established in 1968
Food industry trade groups based in the United Kingdom